Serpent Crest is an audio play in five episodes based on the long-running British science fiction television series Doctor Who. It is written by Paul Magrs, and stars Tom Baker as the Fourth Doctor and Richard Franklin as Captain Mike Yates. It was released on five CDs by BBC Audiobooks between September and December 2011 and is a sequel to 2009's Hornets' Nest and 2010's Demon Quest. They feature multiple actors, but four of the episodes contain some degree of narration by different characters, the exception being the first episode, Tsar Wars.

Serpent Crest

Tsar Wars

(released 8 September 2011)
 The Doctor and Mrs Wibbsey are kidnapped by menacing robots and transported through a wormhole to an extravagant palace, floating in space, a hundred thousand years in the future. A colony of humanoid robots have overthrown their creators and forged a longstanding galactic empire. But now the humans are threatening to overthrow their Robotov Tsars. In an attempt to bring peace, the Tsarina creates Alex, a cyborg infant. And at his heart is a deadly Skishtari Egg.

Cast

 The Doctor / Father Gregory – Tom Baker
 Mrs. Wibbsey – Susan Jameson
 Tsar – Michael Jayston
 Tsarina – Suzy Aitchison
 Boolin – Simon Shepherd
 Servo 53 / Lucius – Sam Hoare
 Servo 96 / Kani – Paul Chequer
 Servo 51 / Bellis – Gabriel Vick
 Servo 14 / Tarnak – Grant Gillespie

The Broken Crown
(released 6 October 2011)
  Wibbsey and the Doctor traverse the wormhole back to Nest Cottage. But Nest Cottage hasn't been built yet. This is Hexford Village in the year 1861. And the TARDIS is a century and a half in the future. They also discover a thirteen-year-old boy with a paper face. And his favourite toy is the powerful Skishtari Egg.

Cast
 The Doctor – Tom Baker
 Mrs Wibbsey – Susan Jameson
 Mr Bewley – Simon Shepherd
 Andrew – Guy Harvey
 Reverend Dobbs – Terrence Hardiman
 Mrs Audley – Joanna David
 Harold – Geoff Leesley
 The Cook – Su Douglas
 Jake – Charlie Mitchell
 Sally – Elinor Coleman

Aladdin Time
(released 3 November 2011)
 Alex, Wibbsey and the Doctor have been pulled within the Skishtari Egg. Now they find themselves trapped in Aladdin's Cave, a labyrinth of magical rooms and strange characters.

Cast
 The Doctor – Tom Baker
 Mrs Wibbsey – Susan Jameson
 The Magician – Simon Shepherd
 Aladdin – Guy Harvey
 Scarf – Andrew Sachs
 Gryphon – Terrence Hardiman
 The Storyteller – Sophie Ward
 Toad – Su Douglas

The Hexford Invasion
(released 8 December 2011)
 The Doctor is reunited with his TARDIS and uses it to return Alex and Boolin to the Robotovs.  Mrs Wibbsey is back at present day Nest Cottage, with the Skishtari Egg buried deep beneath it, as it always has been.  While the Doctor is away, nine months quietly go by for her.  Then Mike Yates returns, along with his former employers, UNIT, on the trail of alien activity. Mike has also teamed up with a strange little man claiming to be the Second Doctor.

Cast
 The Doctor – Tom Baker
 Mrs Wibbsey – Susan Jameson
 Captain Mike Yates – Richard Franklin
 The Visitor – David Troughton
 Reverend Tonge – Cornelius Garrett
 Deirdre – Nerys Hughes
 Tish – Joanna Tope

Survivors in Space
(released 8 December 2011)
 The Skishtari spaceship failed to find their precious Egg and in the process, the entire village of Hexford is accidentally thrown through a wormhole and dumped on a barren moon in a strange galaxy.  For three months, the villagers cope, with only Captain Yates and his mysterious, mop-topped little friend to maintain order.  But the Robotovs' guards are closing in, as are the Skishtari.  Finally, the TARDIS tracks down the misplaced hamlet. The Fourth Doctor and Mrs Wibbsey make their final confrontation, bringing with them the Skishtari Egg, just as it is about to hatch.

Cast
 The Doctor – Tom Baker
 Mrs Wibbsey – Susan Jameson
 Captain Mike Yates – Richard Franklin
 The Visitor – David Troughton
 Reverend Tonge – Cornelius Garrett
 Deirdre – Nerys Hughes
 Tish – Joanna Tope
 Lucius – Sam Hoare
 Tsar – Paddy Wallace

Crew
Writer – Paul Magrs
Producer & Director – Kate Thomas
Script Editor & Executive Producer – Michael Stevens
Cover Illustrators – Brian Williamson

Continuity
This story is a sequel to Hornets' Nest and Demon Quest, with the Fourth Doctor, Yates and Mrs Wibbsey reuniting.  Serpent Crest begins by picking up from the cliffhanger at the end of Demon Quest.
The Fourth Doctor mentions that the Time Lords removed certain events from his memory, just before they force regenerated him at the end of The War Games.  In particular, they hid memories of adventures he had with his other incarnations.  The Second Doctor encountered his previous and following selves in The Three Doctors.  He met them again in The Five Doctors, along with the Fifth Doctor.  He also met the Sixth Doctor in The Two Doctors.  
The Fourth Doctor investigates his past by checking his 500 Year Diary, which was seen with the Second Doctor in The Power of the Daleks and The Tomb of the Cybermen.
The visiting Doctor recalls his adventures with the Cybermen in The Invasion and The Tomb of the Cybermen, the Yeti in The Web of Fear and the giant crabs in The Macra Terror.  He also mentions an encounter with the Daleks in the diamond mines of Marlion, as mentioned in the Paul Magrs novel Verdigris.
The Doctor met the real Rasputin in the novel The Wages of Sin and the audio drama The Wanderer.

Notes
Tsar Wars is the only story in all of the Nest Cottage series to contain no narration.
Tsar Wars reunites the cast of the 1971 film Nicholas and Alexandra, in which Michael Jayston had starred as Tsar Nicholas II of Russia and Tom Baker co-starred as the mad monk Grigori Rasputin (a role which was influential in Barry Letts' decision, in 1974, to cast him as the Fourth Doctor).
Michael Jayston previously appeared in Doctor Who in 1986, playing the Valeyard in the 13-part television serial The Trial of a Time Lord.
Paul Chequer played Eugene Jones in the 2006 Torchwood episode "Random Shoes".
Terrence Hardiman played Hawthorne in the 2010 Doctor Who television episode "The Beast Below".
David Troughton is the son of Second Doctor Patrick Troughton. He previously appeared in Doctor Who in the television serials Enemy of the World in 1967, The War Games in 1969, The Curse of Peladon in 1972, and "Midnight" in 2008.
Nerys Hughes previously appeared in the 1982 Doctor Who television serial Kinda, and in the 2008 Torchwood episode "Something Borrowed".

References

External links
 Press Release
 BBC Store
 Big Finish Store

2011 audio plays
Fourth Doctor audio plays
UNIT audio plays